Ebba Berglund (born 13 June 1998) is a Swedish ice hockey player and member of the Swedish national team, currently playing in the Premier Hockey Federation (PHF) with Metropolitan Riveters.

Berglund represented Sweden in the women's ice hockey tournament at the 2022 Winter Olympics in Beijing.

Personal life
Berglund is out as LGBTQ. She is in a relationship with Canadian ice hockey player and Riveters teammate Sarah Bujold.

In addition to ice hockey, she is an amateur sailor and has competed in the Swedish Sailing Championship.

Career statistics

Regular season and playoffs

International

References

External links
 
 
 

1998 births
Living people
HV71 Dam players
Ice hockey players at the 2022 Winter Olympics
LGBT ice hockey players
Swedish LGBT sportspeople
Linköping HC Dam players
Luleå HF/MSSK players
Modo Hockey Dam players
Olympic ice hockey players of Sweden
People from Örnsköldsvik Municipality
Sportspeople from Västernorrland County
Swedish female sailors (sport)
Swedish women's ice hockey defencemen
21st-century Swedish women